Below is a list of the MPs that make up the African Union's Pan-African Parliament, the respective countries they are elected from, and their political party. The members served during the 2004 to 2009 period.

Algeria
 Boudina Mustapha
 Draoui Mohamed
 Kara Baya
 Chara Bachir
 Hammi Larouiss

Angola
 Domingos Manuel Njinga
 Efigênia dos Santos Lima Clemente
 Fernando José de França Dias Van-Dúnem
 Jerónimo Elavoko Wanga
 Abel Epalanga Chivukuvuku

Benin
 Théophile Nata
 Rosine Vieyra Soglo
 Orou Gabé Orou Sego
 Ismaël Tidjani Serpos
 Madeleine Achade

Botswana
 Mosaraela Goya – Botswana Democratic Party (BDP)
 Ronald Koone Sebego - Botswana Democratic Party (BDP)
 Isaac Mabiletsa – Independent
 Dikgang Makgalemele – (BDP)
 Tshelang Masisi – (BDP)
 Nehemiah Mmoloki Moduble
 Boyce Sebetela
 Maitlhoko Mooka

Burkina Faso
 Oubkiri Marc Yao
 Larba Yarga
 Marie Blandine Sawadogo
 Bénéwendé Stanislas Sankara
 Gilbert Noël Ouédraogo
 Yamba Sawadogo
 Joséphine Drabo Kanyoulou

Burundi
 Pierre Claver Nahimana
 Jean-Baptiste Manwangari
 Schdrack Niyonkuru
 Christian Sendegeya
 Marie-Thérèse Toyi
 Zaïtuni Abdallah

Cameroon
 Essomba Tsoungui Elie Victor
 Imbia Sylvester Itoe
 Silikam néé Manamourou
 Mbonda Elie
 Mbah Ndam Joseph Njang

Cape Verde
 José Manuel Gomes Andrade
 Orlanda Maria Duarte Santos Ferreira
 Mário José Carvalho de Lima
 João Baptista Ferreira Medina
 Eva Verona Teixeira Ortet

Central African Republic
Nouganga Jean-Baptiste 
Mokole Jean-Marie 
Goumba Anne-Marie 
Agba-otikpo Marie 
Jean-Benoît Gonda

Chad
 Idriss Ndele Moussa
 Elise Loum
 Ngarindo Milengar
 Mbaydoum Simeon
 Delwa Kassiré Koumakoye

Congo
 Jean-Pierre Thystère Tchicaya
 Jean-Claude Siapa Ivouloungou
 Mélanie Komzo
 André Obami-Itou
 Zely Pierre Inzoungou-Massanga

Djibouti
 Safia Elmi Djibril
 Abdallah Barkat Ibrahim
 Halo Mohamed Ibrahim
 Houssein Mohamed Ali
 Mahamoud Moustapha Daher

Egypt
 Abdel Ahad Gamal El Din
 Georgette Sobhi Kaliny 
 Mostafa El Guendy
 Mamdouh Hosny Khalil
 Mohammed Ragab Ahmad

Equatorial Guinea
 Pilar Buepoyo Boseka
 Vicente Ehate Tomi
 Francisco Garcia Gaetjens
 Fidel Marcos Mane Ncogo
 Carmelo Mocong Onguene

Ethiopia
 Dawit Yohannes (Deceased)
 Halie-Kiros Gessesse
 Mubarek Sani
 Aster Bekele
 Mulualem Bessie

Gabon
 Henriette Massounga
 René Radembino Coniquet
 Simon Boulamantri
 Pierre Claver Zeng Ebome
 Séraphin Moundounga

The Gambia
 Fabakary Jatta – Government – Alliance for Patriotic Reorientation and Construction
 Halifa Sallah – Opposition – People's Democratic Organisation for Independence and Socialism
 Kalifa Kambi – Government – Alliance for Patriotic Reorientation and Construction
 Bintanding Jarju – Government – Alliance for Patriotic Reorientation and Construction
 Mammah Kandeh – Government – Alliance for Patriotic Reorientation and Construction

Ghana
 Edward K. Doe Adjaho (2009–)
 Ambrose P. Dery (2009–)
 Enoch Teye Mensah (2009–)
 Moses Asaga (2009–)
 Elizabeth Agyemang (2009–)

Guinea
 Koumbia Diallo Boubacar 
 Kante El Hadj Dia
 Aribot Belly 
 Ghussein El Hadj Ismaila Mohamed 
 Somparé Boubacar

Guinea Bissau

Kenya
 Hon. Beatrice P.C. Kones
 Hon. Janet Ongera
 Hon. Dr. Abdullahi Ibrahim Ali
 Hon Jude Njomo
 Hon. Stewart Madzayo

Lesotho
 Oziel Hlalele Motaung
 Malebaka Flory Bulane
 Letuka Nkole
 Thabang Nyeoe
 Khauhelo Deborah Raditapole

Liberia
Joyce Musu Freeman-Sumo – Congress for Democratic Change (CDC)
Armah Z. Jallah – (CDC)
Henry Yallah – Unity Party (UP)
George T. Tengbe – (UP)
Eugene Fallah Kparkar – Liberty Party (LP)

Libya
 Abdulla Edriss Ebrahim
 Amal Nuri Safar
 Aragab Muftah Abudabus
 Mohammed Lutfi Farhat
 Mohammed El-hadhiri

Madagascar
 Rajemison Rakotomaharo
 Jean Lahiniriko
 Rasoanirina Méline
 Raberson Jeannot Emilien
 Philippson Gérard Aimé

Malawi
 Simon Vuwa Kaunda
 Callista Chimombo
 Louis Chimango
 Steven Malamba
 Lovenes Gondwe

Mali
 Ibrahim Boubacar Keïta – Opposition – Rally for Mali
 Mountaga Tall
 Ascofare Oulematou Tamboura
 Moustapha Dicko – Government – Alliance for Democracy in Mali
 Sidibe Korian Sidibe

Mauritania
Habib Ould Diah
Diop Hamady Khalidou
Mohamed El Moustapha Ould Bedr Eddine
Bakar Ould Ahmedou
Diyé Ba

Mauritius
 Premnath Ramnah
 José Arunasalon
 Marie Noelle Françoise Labelle
 Ashit Kumar Gungah
 Arvin Boolell

Mozambique
Macamo Veronica Nataniel 
Dique Enoqe Maria Angelina 
Munhawa Sousa Salvador 
José Gabriel Manteigas 
Eduardo Joaquim Mulémbwè

Namibia
 Peter Katjavivi - South West Africa People's Organization (SWAPO)
 Loide Kasingo - (SWAPO)
 Bernard Sibalatani - (SWAPO)
 Evelyn Nawases-Taeyele - (SWAPO)
 Arnold Tjihuiko - National Unity Democratic Organisation (NUDO)

Niger
 Mounkaïla Aïssata
 MaÏdagi Allambèye
 Hassoumi Massoudou
 Alhousseïni Algoubass
 Mahamane Saley

Nigeria
 Danboyi Usman
 Lee Maeba
 Mohammed Kumalia
 Bankole Dimeji
 Patrica N Ndogu

Rwanda
 Jeanne d’Arc Nyinawase – Liberal Party (LP)
 Gallican Niyongana – Social Democratic Party (SDP)
 Agnès Mukabaranga – Christian Democratic Party (CDP)
 Tharcisse Shamakokera – Rwandan Patriotic Front (RPF)

 Juliana Kantengwa – (RPF)
 Emmanuel Niyigena [Rwandan]

Sahrawi Arab Democratic Republic
Sueilma Beiruk – Popular Front for the Liberation of Saguia el-Hamra and Río de Oro (POLISARIO)
Jamal el-Bendir – (POLISARIO)
Salek Abderrahman – (POLISARIO)
Seniya Ahmed Marhba – (POLISARIO)
Fatma Sidi Nafi – (POLISARIO)

Senegal
 Emile Diatta
 Babacar Gaye
 Ibra Diouf
 Abdoulaye BA
 Aminata Mbengue Ndiaye

Seychelles
 Wavel Ramkalawan
 Simon Gill
 Sylvanne Lemiel
 Terence Mondon
 Regina Esparon

Sierra Leone
 Sheik I. Kamara
 Baba-Jigida
 Dauda Kamara
 Ibrahim Kemoh Sessay
 Abu Mbawa Kongobah

Somalia
 Asha Hagi Elmi 
 Mahamoud Bashi Issa
 Yusuf Mohamed Abdi 
 Farah Ismail Hussein
 Fahma Ahmed Nur
 shakaph hussein ali
 Dr. Mohamed Aden Jeelle

South Africa
Thandi Modise – Government – African National Congress        
Amos Masondo – Government – African National Congress        
Pemmy Majodina – Government – African National Congress        
Richard Majola – Opposition – Democratic Alliance
Julius Malema – Opposition – Economic Freedom Fighters
Mnguni Mzimbele

South Sudan
Albino Aboug – Government – Sudan People's Liberation Movement        
Emmanuel Lowilla – Government – Sudan People's Liberation Movement       
Domai Gatpan Kulang – Government – Sudan People's Liberation Movement      
Sophia Pal Gai – Government – Sudan People's Liberation Movement
Mabior Riiny Lual – Opposition – South Sudan Opposition Alliance

Sudan
 Awad Haj Ali Ahmed (2012 to 2016)
 Bísa Adam
 Sayed Angelo Beda
 Ibrahim Ahmed Ghandor
 Idris Yousif
 Su'ad al-Fatih al-Badawi
 Malik Hussain Hamid

Swaziland
 Marwick Khumalo
 Mphiwa Dlamini
 Michael Temple
 Nokukhanya Gamedze
 Tsandzile Dlamini

Tanzania
 Dr. Gertrude Ibengwe Mongella 
 Omar Sheha Mussa
 Athumani Saidi Janguo
 Prof. Feethan Filipo Banyikwa
 John Momose Cheyo

Togo
 Fambaré Natchaba Ouattara
 Solitoki Magim Esso
 Ptomsoouwé Batchassi
 Loumonvi Fombo
 Améyo Adja

Tunisia
 Sahbi Karoui
 Mohamed Salah Zaray
 Saida Agrebi
 Badreddine Missaoui
 Jalel Lakadar

Uganda
 Cecilia Ogwal – Uganda People's Congress (UPC)
 Sam Otada – Independent
 Beatrice Rusaniya – National Resistance Movement (NRM)
 Sarah Kataike – (NRM)
 Onyango Kakoba – (NRM)

Zambia
 Lucky Mulusa – Movement for Multi-Party Democracy (MMD)
 Mutinta Mazoka – United Party for National Development (UPND)
 Dorothy Kazunga – Patriotic Front (PF)
 Davis Mwango – (PF)
 Patrick Mucheleka – Independent

Zimbabwe
Joram Gumbo – Zimbabwe African National Union – Patriotic Front (ZANU-PF)
Fortune Charumbira – (ZANU-PF)
Kokerai Rugara – Movement for Democratic Change – Tsvangirai (MDC-T)
Editor Matamisa – (MDC-T)
Maxwell Dube – Movement for Democratic Change – Ncube (MDC)

References

External links
 Pan-African Parliament Members

Members of the Pan-African Parliament
Pan-African Parliament
African Union-related lists